Farmer's Market Barbecue is a 1982 studio album by Count Basie and his orchestra.

Track listing
"Way Out Basie" (Ernie Wilkins) – 4:24
"St. Louis Blues" (W. C. Handy) – 7:17
"Beaver Junction" (Harry "Sweets" Edison) – 4:47
"Lester Leaps In" (Lester Young) – 5:01
"Blues for the Barbecue" (Sonny Cohn) – 10:31
"I Don't Know Yet" (Freddie Green) – 4:14
"Ain't That Something" (Bobby Plater) – 4:20
"Jumpin' at the Woodside" (Count Basie) – 3:25

Personnel
 Count Basie – piano
 Sonny Cohn – trumpet
 Dale Carley
 Chris Albert
 Bob Summers
 Bill Hughes - trombone
 Grover Mitchell
 Dennis Wilson
 Mitchell "Booty" Wood
 Danny Turner – alto saxophone
 Bobby Plater
 Eric Dixon – tenor saxophone
 Kenny Hing
 Johnny Williams – baritone saxophone
 Freddie Green – guitar
 James Leary – double bass
 Gregg Field – drums

References

1982 albums
Count Basie Orchestra albums
Albums produced by Norman Granz
Pablo Records albums